The Tonga people of Zambia and Zimbabwe (also called 'Batonga') are a Bantu ethnic group of southern Zambia and neighbouring northern Zimbabwe, and to a lesser extent, in Mozambique. They are related to the Batoka who are part of the Tokaleya people in the same area, but not to the Tonga people of Malawi. In southern Zambia they are patrons of the Kafue Twa. They differ culturally and linguistically from the Tsonga people of South Africa and southern Mozambique.

The Tonga of Zimbabwe 
The BaTonga people of Zimbabwe are found in and around the Binga District, Binga village the Kariba area, and other parts of Matabeleland. They number up to 300,000 and are mostly subsistence farmers. ln Zimbabwe the language of the Tonga people is called tchitonga.

The Tonga People were settled along Lake Kariba after the construction of the Kariba Dam wall.  They stretch from Chirundu, Kariba town, Mola, Binga to Victoria Falls.

In the 1800s, during the reign of Mzilikazi and Lobengula, BaTonga people were regarded by the Ndebele (at the time called the "Matabele") as very peaceful. Early British explorers also regarded them as "wholesome" and "entirely peaceful" on "both sides of the Zambezi."

Human-Environmental Interactions of the Tonga of Zambia 
The Longitudinal Gwembe Tonga Research project a 50-year study took place in southern Zambia uses carrying capacity to explain general social processes and the human-environment interactions of the Tonga people. In the article Carrying Capacity's New Guise: Folk Models for Public Debate and Longitudinal Study of Environmental Change, Lisa Cligget focuses on the relationship between the Tonga people and the environment. The construction of the Kariba Dam caused 57,000 Tonga people on both sides of the Zambian lake due to constant flooding. Lake Kariba is the largest artificial reservoir in the world. A majority of the population moved up stream. However, last minute engineering forced 6000 people to relocate to Lusitu a small village downstream from the dam. Lusitu is known as the most ecological disturbed region.The drought cycle is a common ecological risk that affects the southern African farmers and directly impacts the Tonga people's access to food. The worst drought in the past decade happened between 1994 and 1995 in Lusitu. This drought caused no harvest for the people in Lusitu. Economic factors have influenced relationships within and outside of Tonga people community. The economic factors in the region include; the collapse of the copper industry, and the structural adjustment program. The structural adjustment program for these rural communities cut government funding limiting infrastructure even more. The consequences of the structural adjustment program means clinics do not have access to aspirin, chloroquine, antibiotics and other medications. The negative effect on education in these rural areas that are remote makes it challenging to find teachers to accept and keep positions. The Tonga people in Lusitu and surrounding areas have become dependent on agriculture production and kinship family networks.

Languages 
The Tonga language of Zambia is spoken by about 1.38 million people in Zambia and 137,000 in Zimbabwe; it is an important lingua franca in parts of those countries and is spoken by members of other ethnic groups as well as the Tonga. 
(The Malawian Tonga language is classified in a different zone of the Bantu languages.)

Tonga also speak Shona and Ndebele in Zimbabwe, English in Zambia and Zimbabwe, and Portuguese in Mozambique as second languages.

Notable Tonga People 

 Hakainde Hichilema
 Anderson Mazoka *
 Ackron Zyumbwe
 James Ndambo
 Habatwa Mweene*

 Andrew Sikajaya Muntanga *
 Hon. Mulambo Haimbe
 Hon. Jacob Mwiimbu
 Hon. Gary Nkombo
 Hon. Cornelius Mweetwa
 Hantobolo*
 * the ones marked with a star (footnote) are late as of 15th January 2023.

See also
Choma Museum and Crafts Project

References